Thorganby railway station served the village of Thorganby, North Yorkshire, England from 1912 to 1964 on the Derwent Valley Light Railway. The station had services northwards to York (Layerthorpe railway station) and south to Cliffe Common, which was a station on the line between Selby and Market Weighton.

History 
Whilst the line was first proposed in 1898, it wasn't built until 1912. Thorganby station opened to passengers in July 1913, along with the other stations on the Derwent Valley Light Railway, and it closed to passengers in 1926.

During the passenger carrying era, the service pattern was typically three return trains per day, though delays were frequent as the trains were mixed passenger and goods, and this involved some shunting at stations.

The station at Thorganby was on the east side of the line and had just one platform, though a passing loop was installed immediately south of the station and the goods yard had four sidings.

Complete closure to freight came in December 1964; only the station building remains, which is in a derelict state, however, the stationmasters house survives as a private dwelling.

References

Sources

External links 
 Geograph image of station building

Disused railway stations in North Yorkshire
Railway stations in Great Britain opened in 1912
Railway stations in Great Britain closed in 1926
1912 establishments in England
1968 disestablishments in England